John Anderson (born ) is an American sports commentator who has served as host of the ESPN TV program SportsCenter since June 1999.

Early life and education
Anderson grew up in Green Bay, Wisconsin, graduating from Green Bay Southwest High School. He holds a journalism degree from the University of Missouri. He is active within the MU Alumni Association and can often be seen at Missouri Tigers sporting events, and served as the grand marshal at Missouri's 2002 homecoming football game.

Career
After college graduating, Anderson worked for KTUL-TV and KOTV-TV in Tulsa, Oklahoma, and KPHO-TV in  Phoenix at before joining ESPN.

From 2008 to 2014, he and John Henson hosted Wipeout, a reality game show on ABC.

Anderson was presented with the Bill Teegins Excellence in Sportscasting Award in 2011.

In 2021, Anderson was a commentator on track and field events at the 2020 Summer Olympics for Olympic Broadcasting Services.

References

External links
John Anderson ESPN Bio

Living people
American television sports anchors
Sportspeople from Green Bay, Wisconsin
Missouri School of Journalism alumni
People from Southington, Connecticut
ESPN people
Year of birth missing (living people)